Cohosh is a common name in the English language for several loosely related woodland herbs. 
The name may derive from Algonquian (Eastern Abenaki / Penobscot) '*kkwὰhas', meaning 'rough', possibly describing leaves or compound flowers.

It may refer to:

 Black cohosh, Actaea racemosa (Ranunculaceae)
 Blue cohosh, Caulophyllum thalictroides (Berberidaceae)
 Red cohosh, Actaea rubra (Ranunculaceae)
 White cohosh, Actaea pachypoda (Ranunculaceae)